Shon Gables is currently an evening news anchor with WANF in Atlanta

Broadcasting career
Gables worked as a news anchor at WCBS-TV in New York City. As co-anchor of CBS 2 News This Morning from 2003 to 2006, Gables covered many New York City events, including the New York City Subway Centennial Celebration; the Republican National Convention; the Summer Olympics bid; the re-opening of the Statue of Liberty; the Twin Towers Memorial; the NYC Transit strike; and the Blackout of 2003.

Gables has hosted several specials such as "Salute to NYC Schools: Truman High School" and the "Tunnel to Towers Run". Gables also participated in the run, which honored the NYC firefighters who died on September 11, 2001. Gables also wrote and anchored "Salute to Harlem", which explored Harlem’s economic development, social impact and future.

Gables launched her broadcast journalism career at KWCH-DT in Wichita, KS, where she reported and anchored the station's public affairs program. She then moved on to KWTV-DT in Oklahoma City, OK, promoted from associate producer to education reporter and news anchor, covering US military issues affecting Tinker Air Force Base. Next, Gables became morning news anchor/general assignment reporter for WDIV-TV in Detroit, MI. There, she covered breaking stories with all three US Automakers and served as spokesperson for the American Cancer Society's Southwest Michigan Division, which led her to produce a two-hour special on breast cancer awareness for WDIV. Gables also spent time in radio broadcasting, serving KVSP in Oklahoma City as news director and host.  From 2007 to 2010, Gables was the host of Black Enterprise Business Report.  She was then the weekend morning anchor for WFAA-TV in Dallas, TX until 2014 and an anchor with KTBS-TV in Shreveport, LA between 2016 and 2018.

Awards and achievements
Gables was recently nominated for an Emmy Award for "On-Camera Achievement." She also is the recipient of several National Association of Black Journalists awards and a Lee Evans Outstanding Journalist Award, and was honored with the 2003 New York City Excellence in Media Award by the Harlem Chamber of Commerce.

In addition, Gables was the recipient of a National Black Achiever in Industry Award, an American Women in Radio and Television’s Gracie Award, and was one of Network Journal’s "40 Under 40" Black Achievers.

Gables is on the board of Eagle Academy, an all-boys public school in the Bronx, New York; she serves on the advisory board of EthiDolls, an Ethnic specialty doll manufacturer; and is a supporter of NFTE, the Network For Teaching Entrepreneurship; and has teamed with Goldman Sachs for its annual youth awards program.

Gables graduated from the University of Oklahoma with a degree in economics, and served in the United States Army Reserves for seven years. She also holds an Executive MBA from Louisiana Tech University's College of Business.

Projects
Gables went behind camera, and executive-produced her first film, Lord Help Us, released nationally in May 2007.

Her next project, The Mocha Manual to a Fabulous Pregnancy DVD, debuted Mother's Day 2008. It is based on the top selling book written by Kimberly Allers, published by Amistad/HarperCollins.

References

External links
The Mocha Manual
Black Enterprise

Living people
American television journalists
Television anchors from New York City
Television anchors from Oklahoma City
Year of birth missing (living people)
People from Dallas
Journalists from Texas